Morozovka is a rural locality (a village) in Krasnogorsky District, Bryansk Oblast, Russia. The population was 83 as of 2013. There is 1 street.

References 

Rural localities in Krasnogorsky District, Bryansk Oblast